Latica is a monotypic genus of South American ground spiders containing the single species, Latica galeanoi. It was first described by B. A. da Silva, J. C. Guerrero and L. Bidegaray-Batista in 2020 and placed into the subfamily Herpyllinae.

See also
 List of Gnaphosidae species

References

Monotypic Gnaphosidae genera
Spiders of South America